The 2006–07 Iraqi Premier League kicked off on December 22, 2006 and finished on July 6, 2007. Erbil were crowned champions for the first time in their history, defeating Al-Quwa Al-Jawiya 1–0 in the final, hosted at the Franso Hariri Stadium, Erbil's home ground.

Group stage

North Group

Central Group 1

Note: Diyala withdrew from the league and were relegated. Lower division side Al-Ramadi were chosen to replace them but they also withdrew.

Central Group 2

South Group

Elite stage

Group 1

Group 2

Golden stage

Semi-finals

Third place match

Final

Match officials
Assistant referees:
Sabhan Ahmed
Ahmed Abdul-Hussein
Fourth official:
Sabah Qasim

Match rules
90 minutes.
30 minutes of extra-time if necessary.
Penalty shootout if scores still level.

Final positions

Top scorers

References

External links
 Iraq Football Association

Iraqi Premier League seasons
1
Iraq